The Six Wives of Henry Lefay, also known as My Dad's Six Wives, is a 2009 American comedy film starring Elisha Cuthbert and Tim Allen. A grieving daughter tries to arrange her father's funeral, while putting up with all of his ex-wives. Its only theatrical release was in Israel, and it was launched straight to DVD elsewhere, including the United States and the United Kingdom.

Plot
During a trip to Mexico with his fiancée, salesman Henry Lefay (Tim Allen) disappears while parasailing and is presumed dead. His grieving daughter (Elisha Cuthbert) begins to make funeral arrangements, a process made tricky when his current wife and five exes descend and wage a fierce power struggle over the burial.

Cast
Tim Allen as Henry Lefay, a flashy salesman who is presumed dead after he goes missing during a parasailing expedition
Elisha Cuthbert as Barbara "Barbie" Lefay (Henry's daughter)
S. Epatha Merkerson as Effa Devereaux (Henry's secret first wife)
Andie MacDowell as Kate (Henry's second wife and Barbie's mother)
Jenna Elfman as Ophelia (Henry's third and fifth wife and current occasional lover)
Paz Vega as Veronica (Henry's fourth wife)
Lindsay Sloane as Autumn (Henry's sixth wife)
Jenna Dewan as Sarah Jane (Henry's fiancée and nemesis of Barbie)
Barbara Barrie as Mae (Henry's mother)
Eric Christian Olsen as Lloyd Wiggins (Barbie's boyfriend who wants to marry her)
Chris Klein as Stevie
Larry Miller as Lipschutz
Edward Herrmann as Goodenough, the funeral director

Release history

See also

References

External links

2000s screwball comedy films
American screwball comedy films
Funeral homes in fiction
2009 comedy films
2009 films
2000s English-language films
2000s American films